The Lonchopteridae (spear-winged flies or pointed-wing flies) are a family of small (2–5 mm), slender, yellow to brownish-black Diptera, occurring all over the world. Their common name refers to their pointed wings, which have a distinct venation. Many are parthenogenic; males are very rare, however, at least in North American species, and have a somewhat different venation than do the females.

Spear-winged flies are common in moist, shady, grassy areas, where the larvae are found within decaying vegetation.  One species, Lonchoptera bifurcata, is cosmopolitan in distribution, and may have been transported via shipments of vegetables.

Description
For terms see Morphology of Diptera.
The Lonchopteridae are minute, slender flies with long wings which are pointed at the apex. The head is rounded, with the outer vertical bristles, inner vertical bristles, ocellar bristles, interfrontal bristles, and bristles along the margin of the broad mouth very well developed. The mesonotum and scutellum and legs have well developed bristles. The radial vein R has three branches (R1, R2+3, R4+5). The median vein M is furcate (M1, M2). The anal vein A merges with the cubital vein Cu (female) or terminates freely (male).

Systematics
They are usually placed in the superfamily of flat-footed flies and allies (Platypezoidea). If the Platypezoidea are restricted to the flat-footed flies sensu stricto, the spear-winged flies are united with the Ironomyiidae and the coffin and scuttle flies (Phoridae) as Phoroidea. More rarely, they are treated as monotypic superfamily Lonchopteroidea.

Four living genera are in this family, encompassing some 50 described species all together:
 Homolonchoptera Yang, 1998
 Lonchoptera Meigen, 1803
 Neolonchoptera Vaillant, 1989
 Spilolonchoptera Yang, 1998

Two fossil genera of spear-winged flies have been described:
 Lonchopterites Grimaldi & Cumming, 1999
 Lonchopteromorpha Grimaldi & Cumming, 1999

Species
West Palaearctic including Russia
Australasian/Oceanian
Nearctic
Japan
World list

References

External links 
 Lonchopteridae In Italian
 Lonchopteridae page at the Bishop Museum, Honolulu
 Family Lonchopteridae at EOL Image Gallery
 Photograph of Lonchoptera furcata Fallén Should be L. bifurcata.
 Photograph of Lonchoptera lutea Panzer

 
Brachycera families
Taxa named by Pierre-Justin-Marie Macquart